William Story may refer to:
 
 William Wetmore Story (1819–1895), American artist and art critic
 William Edward Story (1850–1930), American mathematician
 William Story (Australian politician) (1857–1924), member of the Australian Senate and the Australian House of Representatives
 William Story (attorney) (1843–1921), Arkansas judge and later Colorado politician
 William Story (cricketer) (1852–1939), British Army officer and English cricketer

See also
William Storey (disambiguation)